Sorority Boys is a 2002 American comedy film directed by Wallace Wolodarsky, about a group of college boys who dress up as girls in order to prove their innocence for a crime they did not commit. The film starred Barry Watson, Michael Rosenbaum and Harland Williams.

Plot
Dave, Adam, and Doofer, three members of the Kappa Omicron Kappa fraternity, are accused of stealing money from the fraternity treasury and are run out of the house. Doofer suggests that they find the real thief by reviewing tapes from Adam's room, which Adam has rigged with a video camera in order to surreptitiously record his sexual conquests.  In order to enter the house, the three dress up as "Adina," "Roberta," and "Daisy" to attend a ladies night party at the frat. The other brothers mistake the three boys for tall, ugly girls and throw them out of the house. The women of the Delta Omicron Gamma sorority rescue them and invite them to stay at their sorority house.

Adam learns that a KOK member named Jimmy has moved into his old room. He decides to dress as Adina and seduce Jimmy so he can get the tape.  He plans to give Jimmy a roofie pill to make him fall asleep.  However, Jimmy, thinking Adam is a woman, slips him a roofie as well and both pass out.

The three boys learn that the KOKs are bringing Adam's tapes onto the annual KOK-Tail Cruise to serve as entertainment for the alumni.  They help the DOG sisters win an all-girl football game, knowing that tickets to the cruise are the prize. Leah dances with Dave/Daisy and confesses to wanting a relationship. "Daisy," knowing the ruse will end soon when the group finds the tape, tells Leah "she" is moving back to Minnesota. 

Daisy changes back into Dave for a job interview with an alumnus. After the interview, the three boys change back into their feminine garb and share a group hug in celebration. Leah walks in while Daisy and Adina are embracing and mistakenly thinks that they are in a relationship and the "Minnesota" excuse was fake. She storms out with Daisy following her.

The alumnus later grabs Leah on the rear and she slaps him across the face. He calls for Leah to be thrown overboard. Daisy reveals her true identity as Dave to stop the men, while Roberta is exposed as Doofer when he is caught with the tape, and Adina is exposed as Adam. The KOK High Council convenes to determine their fate, with Dave lamenting the way they have historically treated the DOGs and states he no longer wants to be a member of KOK. Dave accuses fraternity president Spence of stealing the money, and Doofer produces the tape to prove it. The KOKs throw Spence overboard.

Later, at the KOK house, Adam is named president. Dave meets with Leah and starts their relationship over, truthfully this time, and Doofer begins a relationship with one of the DOG girls.

Cast

Reception
The film was panned by critics. On Rotten Tomatoes, it has an approval rating of 12% based on 65 reviews, with an average score of 3.22/10. The website's consensus reads: "A sloppy fratboy movie, Sorority Boys offers up a parade of gross-out gags and sex jokes, while insulting and ogling women." On Metacritic, the film has a rank of 25 out of 100 based on 20 critics, indicating "generally unfavorable reviews".

The film barely made back its $12 million budget, grossing a worldwide total of $12,517,488.

Lisa Schwarzbaum of Entertainment Weekly gave the film a score of a "B", saying that "There are moments of real funniness in this smarter-than-anticipated goof-fest".

Ed Gonzalez of Slant Magazine gave the film 1.5 stars out of 5, explaining his reasoning by the fact that "Sorority Boys only confirms the threat posed to the film industry when homo-wary frat boys are allowed to play director".

The New York Timess A. O. Scott criticized the film's director, saying that "[he] has made a film that even a rabid lowbrow like Homer Simpson (or, when the mood strikes, this critic) would find beneath his dignity".

See also
Cross-dressing in film and television

References

External links

American sex comedy films
American teen comedy films
Cross-dressing in American films
Touchstone Pictures films
Films about fraternities and sororities
Films scored by Mark Mothersbaugh
2000s sex comedy films
Films directed by Wallace Wolodarsky
2002 comedy films
2000s English-language films
2000s American films